Marcelat Sakobi Matshu (born 29 March 1986) is a boxer from the Democratic Republic of the Congo. She competed in the 2020 Summer Olympics.

References

1996 births
Living people
Democratic Republic of the Congo male boxers
Sportspeople from Kinshasa
Boxers at the 2020 Summer Olympics
Olympic boxers of the Democratic Republic of the Congo
African Games competitors for DR Congo
Competitors at the 2019 African Games
21st-century Democratic Republic of the Congo people